Farkhod Tokhirov (born 29 May 1990) is a Tajikistani footballer who currently plays for Perak FA. He is a member of the Tajikistan national football team.

Career

Club
Tokhirov scored a hat-trick in his last game for Khujand, finishing with 36 goals in 91 games in all competitions.

International
Tokhirov played for Tajikistan in 2007 FIFA U-17 World Cup and 2012 AFC Challenge Cup.

Career statistics

International

Statistics accurate as of match played 6 September 2016

International goals

Honors

Club
Istiklol
Tajik League (2): 2010, 2011
Tajik Cup (2): 2010
AFC President's Cup (1): 2012

References

1990 births
Living people
Tajikistani footballers
Tajikistani expatriate footballers
Association football defenders
Tajikistan international footballers
Expatriate footballers in Uzbekistan
Tajikistani expatriate sportspeople in Uzbekistan
Sportspeople from Dushanbe
Tajikistan Higher League players
FK Andijon players
Tajikistan youth international footballers